Denison is an unincorporated community in Spokane County, in the U.S. state of Washington. The community is located on U.S. Route 395 19 miles due north of Downtown Spokane and about seven miles beyond that city's northern suburban developments. Denison lends its name to two roads in the area, Denison Road and Denison-Chattaroy Road, both of which intersect with Route 395 in the immediate vicinity of Denison. The city of Deer Park is four miles to the north.

History
A post office called Denison was established in 1908, and remained in operation until 1967. The community was named after the maiden name of an early settler's wife.

References

Unincorporated communities in Spokane County, Washington
Unincorporated communities in Washington (state)